Sawgrass Mills is an outlet shopping mall in Sunrise, Florida owned by Simon Property Group. With  of retail selling space, it is the eleventh largest mall in the United States, the largest single story outlet mall in the U.S., the largest shopping mall in Broward County, the second largest mall in Florida and the Miami metropolitan area after the Aventura Mall, and the third largest shopping mall in the southeastern United States.

Overview 
Designed in the shape of an alligator, Sawgrass Mills opened in 1990 as the third mall developed by the now-defunct Mills Corporation (now part of Simon Property Group) and has been expanded multiple times since then, and is located next to FLA Live Arena. There are over 329 retail outlets and name brand discounters. The anchor stores are Marshalls, Last Call by Neiman Marcus, Bed Bath & Beyond, Primark, BrandsMart USA, Super Target, Q Store California, Burlington Coat Factory, Nordstrom Rack, Regal Cinemas, and TJ Maxx.

Because of its size, Sawgrass Mills is divided into three parts: the main mall, "The Oasis at Sawgrass Mills", an outdoor component opened in 1999 including GameWorks which is now GameRoom in 2011, now In The Game in 2018, Regal Cinemas, IMAX, Nordstrom Rack, Off Broadway Shoe Warehouse, The Cheesecake Factory, California Pizza Kitchen, Texas de Brazil, Yard House, and Shake Shack, and "The Colonnade Outlets at Sawgrass Mills" was opened in 2006 as an upscale lifestyle area with shops and restaurants, anchored by Last Call By Neiman Marcus.  Additionally, there are numerous "outparcel" stores and plazas.

The mall is named after saw grass, Cladium mariscus subsp. jamaicense, a very common plant in the Everglades. The mall's west Broward location was part of the Everglades before human development, and is less than a mile from the extent of the Everglades that is still present (just beyond the nearby State Road 869).

History
The Phase I mall was dedicated in two stages. The first opened October 4, 1990 with the BrandSmart USA/Sears Outlet wing at the eastern end, extending past the Garden Food Court (next to Bealls, previously the Hurricane Food Court), to the Books-A-Million store at the western end of the mall. A second stage, dedicated November 15, 1990, extended the mall westward of the Books-A-Million store, past the second food court, the Market Food Court (next to Dick's Sporting Goods, previously the Sports Food Court) to the Marshalls/Spiegel Outlet (now Neiman Marcus Last Call Clearance Center) wing. Cobb Theatres (became Regal Cinemas in 1997) built an 18-screen cinema located at the Northeast corner of the mall, opening in December 1991. A Target Greatland was added to the east wing of the mall, opening in March 1992. It was expanded into a Super Target store in mid-2006. Phar-Mor was another early anchor to the mall. Sam's Club opened outside of the mall to customers in 1993.

A Phase II addition, known as Veranda Main Street, opened November 14, 1995. It ran parallel to the middle mall corridor and contained T.J. Maxx, Service Merchandise and the first location of Last Call by Neiman Marcus. This section is currently anchored by T.J. Maxx (in the old Service Merchandise/American Signature Home space). This expansion was followed by The Oasis extension, opened April 15, 1999. It brought the mall out from near Burlington Coat Factory to Regal Cinemas (which was expanded to 23 screens). A parking garage was added in 2002 directly across the outside entrance to Burlington Coat Factory. Wannado City, an indoor amusement park with entry fee, opened in Spring 2004.

The Colonnade Outlets at Sawgrass Mills opened in 2006, and was designed by BCT Design Group out of Baltimore. It is an outdoor outlet shopping plaza featuring outlets of more upscale brands such as St. John, Burberry, Coach, Michael Kors, Ralph Lauren, Kate Spade, and Tommy Bahama and restaurants such as Grand Lux Cafe, P. F. Chang's China Bistro, Villagio, and Zinburger. The Colonnade Outlets had expansions completed in 2009 and 2016 with the latest expansion featuring Tory Burch, John Varvartos, Giorgio Armani, Versace, Ted Baker, and Florida's first Matchbox restaurant. A new parking garage opened next to the Colonnade Outlets in 2016 to accommodate more mall visitors and a Seasons 52 restaurant opened in Spring 2019. In August 2019, Barneys New York announced that their location would close as part of plan to close fifteen locations nationwide due to bankruptcy, and AC Hotels by Marriott opened in 2020.

Originally, the concourses had names and each turn was considered a rotunda or court and named for the style of stores it contained. The original mall concourses (running west to east) were Modern Main Street, Mediterranean Main Street, Art Deco Main Street and Caribbean Main Street. The courts were (running west to east) Entertainment Court, Cabana Court, Video Court, Rotunda Court and New Ideas Court. This proved harder to keep in effect as anchors and internal stores changed. Later, mall entrances were named after the parking lot areas, i.e., Yellow Toucan, Green Toad, Purple Parrot, White Seahorse, Red Snapper, Blue Dolphin, Pink Flamingo and New Ideas Court. In the mid-2000s, inspired by rival Dolphin Mall in Miami, the mall transitioned into the "Avenues" sections.

There was a kid's animatronic display in the Cabana Court, between Books-A-Million and the Rainforest Cafe, featuring singing flamingos and alligators welcoming the public to Sawgrass Mills.  It was set up like a swamp and allowed people to toss coins into the shallow water which were donated to local charities.  It was later converted to a waiting area designed after a ship, still with alligators, and then into Cha Cha's Adventure play area. The play area was removed in 2016 to make way for the improvements for Century 21 Department Store. Wannado City closed on January 12, 2011.

In 2013, Sawgrass Mills opened a new wing called Fashion Row in the former site of Wannado City.

Local retailer L. Luria & Sons was slated to open an anchor at Sawgrass Mills. A lawsuit ensued when catalog showroom chain Service Merchandise opened instead, as the Luria company blamed Mills Corporation for choosing Service Merchandise instead.

An expansion was opened in 2018 called the "Town Center at Sawgrass Mills" which features 25 full-price retailers, 4 new sit down restaurants, and another new parking garage for 2,000 vehicles. The new expansion is situated next to the recently expanded Colonnade Outlets and acts as an extension to the Colonnade Outlets but it was cancelled for some reasons.

On September 10, 2020, it was announced that Century 21 Department Store would be closing all stores, including the Sawgrass Mills location. This location closed on December 6, 2020.

In 2021, Q Store California opened the former Century 21.

On September 15, 2022, it was announced that Bed Bath & Beyond would be closing as part of a plan to close 150 stores nationwide.

Department stores and anchors

See also
 List of largest shopping malls in the United States

References

External links
Official Website

Shopping malls in Broward County, Florida
Outlet malls in the United States
Shopping malls established in 1990
1990 establishments in Florida
Simon Property Group
Sunrise, Florida